The Diego Luis Cordoba Technological University of Choco, also known as UTCH, is a public, departmental, coeducational university based in the city of Quibdó, Chocó, Colombia.

See also

 List of universities in Colombia

Notes

External links
 Technological University of Choco official site 

Universities and colleges in Colombia
Educational institutions established in 1972